Three thirteen is a variation of the card game Rummy. It is an eleven-round game played with two or more players. It requires two decks of cards with the jokers removed. Like other Rummy games, once the hands are dealt, the remainder of the cards are placed face down on the table. The top card from the deck is flipped face up and put beside the deck to start the discard pile.

Gameplay
Each player attempts to meld all of the cards in their hand into sets.

A set may be either:
A flush of 3 or more such as 

You can call the win before the play on the turn of the kings.

Sets can contain more than three cards, however, the same card cannot be included in multiple sets.

Once a player has melded all of their cards into sets, they "go out". They must still discard when "going out", and the remaining players are given one more draw to better their hands. The winner of a game of "Three thirteen" is the player who, at the end of the final round, has accumulated the fewest points.

Dealing
The first dealer, chosen at random, deals three cards to each player. In each successive round, the deal passes to the left. In the second round, the dealer deals four cards to each player. With each successive round, the number of cards dealt to start the round increases until the eleventh and final round in which thirteen cards each are dealt.

Playing
The player to dealer's left is the first to play, and the play moves clockwise. When it is a player's turn, they choose to draw either the top card from the discard pile or the top card from the top of the deck. Then the player must discard one card from their hand and place that card on top of the discard pile to conclude their turn. Have to go around once before going out.

Wild cards
In each round there is a designated wild card. The wild card is the card equal to the number of cards dealt. In the first round, three cards are dealt, so Threes are wild cards. In the second round four cards are dealt, so Fours are wild. When 11, 12, and 13 cards are dealt, the J, Q, and K are the respective wild cards. Wild cards can be used in place of any other card in making a group or sequence. A player can only use one wild card in each set.

Scoring
At the end of a given round, each of a player's cards that cannot be placed into a set counts towards their score. 

Any wild cards that remain unused in a player's hand at the conclusion of a round count as 15 points.

Variations
 According to some rules, Aces can be used as high or low in a sequence. In this case an Ace remaining in your hand at the end costs 15 points, rather than one.
 Some rules score 11 points for Jacks, 12 for Queens and 13 for Kings.
 An extra round (twelfth) or two (thirteenth) where there are 14 and 15 cards dealt for each player and Aces and 2s are wild respectively. Some call it "Fourteens" or "Fifteens".
 Some rules designate Jokers as additional wild cards. In that case, a joker left in a player's hand at the conclusion of a round counts as 20 points.
 In other variations, Jokers as wild cards can be discarded onto any pile of any other player and count for no points.
 Another variation plays 22 rounds starting from 3 to 13 and then back down from 13 to 3
Some rule state can discard card in front of you. Player has choice to pick from various pile. This makes the game move faster.
 In games with a "Redemption round", after a player goes out, the other players get one last play and can lay down any melds on their own table or deadwood cards on other players' tables. If it is possible to get rid of all one's cards in the redemption round, the player will receive 0 points. 
 Points are doubled on the 11th (Jacks), 12th (Queens), and 13th (Kings) round.
 Some rules state that a player can make a set that consists only of wild cards.
 Some play that if a player goes out incorrectly, this is counted as +20 points.
 Double-naughts: A rule where if each player goes out with zero points on a given hand, the hand is replayed as if it never happened.
 Some variations allow for a fixed negative score for the first player to go out each round.  Common point values include -5, -10, or a negative value equal to the wild card. (-8 points if the 8 card is wild)

See also
Dummy rummy
Bing rummy

References
 From an online database of card games.

Rummy
Year of introduction missing